Options spreads are the basic building blocks of many options trading strategies. A spread position is entered by buying and selling options of the same class on the same underlying security but with different strike prices or expiration dates. An option spread shouldn't be confused with a spread option. The three main classes of spreads are the horizontal spread, the vertical spread and the diagonal spread. They are grouped by the relationships between the strike price and expiration dates of the options involved -

Vertical spreads, or money spreads, are spreads involving options of the same underlying security, same expiration month, but at different strike prices.

Horizontal, calendar spreads, or time spreads are created using options of the same underlying security, same strike prices but with different expiration dates.

Diagonal spreads are constructed using options of the same underlying security but different strike prices and expiration dates. They are called diagonal spreads because they are a combination of vertical and horizontal spreads.

List of spreads
Any spread that is constructed using calls can be referred to as a call spread, while a put spread is constructed using puts.

Bull and bear spreads
If a spread is designed to profit from a rise in the price of the underlying security, it is a bull spread. A bear spread is a spread where favorable outcome is obtained when the price of the underlying security goes down.

Credit and debit spreads
If the premiums of the options sold is higher than the premiums of the options purchased, then a net credit is received when entering the spread. If the opposite is true, then a debit is taken. Spreads that are entered on a debit are known as debit spreads while those entered on a credit are known as credit spreads.

Ratio spreads and backspreads
There are also spreads in which unequal number of options are simultaneously purchased and written. When more options are written than purchased, it is a ratio spread. When more options are purchased than written, it is a backspread.

Spread combinations
Many options strategies are built around spreads and combinations of spreads. For example, a bull put spread is basically a bull spread that is also a credit spread while the iron butterfly can be broken down into a combination of a bull put spread and a bear call spread.

Box spread
A box spread consists of a bull call spread and a bear put spread. The calls and puts have the same expiration date. The resulting portfolio is delta neutral.  For example, a 40-50 January 2010 box consists of:
 Long a January 2010 40-strike call
 Short a January 2010 50-strike call
 Long a January 2010 50-strike put
 Short a January 2010 40-strike put

A box spread position has a constant payoff at exercise equal to the difference in strike values.  Thus, the 40-50 box example above is worth 10 at exercise.  For this reason, a box is sometimes considered a "pure interest rate play" because buying one basically constitutes lending some money to the counterparty until exercise.

Box spreads expose investors to low-probability, extremely-high severity risk:  if the options are exercised early, they can incur a loss much greater than the expected gain.

Net volatility

The net volatility of an option spread trade is the volatility level such that the theoretical value of the spread trade is equal to the spread's market price. In practice, it can be considered the implied volatility of the option spread.

References
 

Options (finance)
Derivatives (finance)